Amt Schlieben is an Amt ("collective municipality") in the district of Elbe-Elster, in Brandenburg, Germany. Its seat is in Schlieben.

The Amt Schlieben consists of the following municipalities:
Fichtwald
Hohenbucko
Kremitzaue
Lebusa
Schlieben

Demography

External links

Schlieben
Elbe-Elster